is a 1983 film directed by Kinji Fukasaku, Sadao Nakajima and Junya Satō.

Cast
Keiko Matsuzaka
Toshiyuki Nagashima
Kie Nakai
Hiroki Matsukata
Aiko Morishita
Hideo Murota
Morio Kazama
Kō Nishimura
Toshiro Mifune
Kantarō Suga
Yuriko Mishima
Takashi Noguchi	
Kinji Nakamura	
 Jūkei Fujioka as Sugigen
 Nenji Kobayashi as Terakane
Mitsuru Hirata	
Tomisaburō Wakayama

References

External links

1983 films
1980s Japanese-language films
1983 drama films
Films directed by Sadao Nakajima
Films directed by Junya Satō
Films directed by Kinji Fukasaku
Toei Company films
Japanese drama films
1980s Japanese films